Nieuw-Vennep is a railway station in Nieuw-Vennep, Netherlands located on the Weesp–Leiden railway. It the second station in Nieuw Vennep; there existed an earlier one on the Hoofddorp–Leiden railway (commonly referred to as the Haarlemmermeerspoorlijn; from Aalsmeer to Haarlem, via Hoofddorp and Leiden). This station opened in 1912 and closed in 1936.

The current station is serviced by regional trains and opened on 31 May 1981. It is operated by the Nederlandse Spoorwegen.

Train service
, the following train services call at this station:
4x per hour local Sprinter service between Leiden, Schiphol Airport, Amsterdam, Zaandam, and Hoorn
4x per hour local Sprinter service between The Hague, Leiden, Schiphol Airport, Amsterdam, Almere, Lelystad, and Zwolle

Bus services

 90 from Nieuw-Vennep to Hillegom, Noordwijkerhout, Noordwijk, Katwijk, Wassenaar, and Den Haag Centraal
 92 from Hillegom to Beinsdorp, and Nieuw-Vennep
 162 from Hoofddorp to Nieuw-Vennep, and Lisse
 164 from Sassenheim to Abbenes, Nieuw-Vennep, and Hoofddorp

External links

NS website 
Dutch Public Transport journey planner 
Arriva website 
Connexxion website 

Railway stations in North Holland
Railway stations opened in 1912
Railway stations closed in 1936
Railway stations opened in 1981
1912 establishments in the Netherlands
Railway stations in the Netherlands opened in the 20th century